The AW50 is a .50 BMG anti-materiel precision rifle designed by Accuracy International. It is a re-engineered version of the Accuracy International Arctic Warfare L96 sniper rifle (the standard issue sniper rifle in the British forces).

Overview
The AW50 is intended to engage a variety of targets, including radar installations, light vehicles (including light armoured vehicles), field fortifications, boats and ammunition dumps.  The weight of the weapon (15 kg | 33 lbs), combined with a muzzle brake and a hydraulic buffer system in the butt, gives the AW50F relatively low recoil and enhances accuracy.  The Picatinny rail can hold a variety of equipment; the normal sight for the AW50 is the Schmidt & Bender 3-12x50 PM II with Al Mil Dot reticle, 0.2 mrad clicks and elevation to 1500 m and laser protection. Night vision device sights such as the Simrad KN series or Hensoldt NSV 80 can also be fitted.

AW50F
The AW50F is a folding stock variant of the AW50, which fires the multi-purpose Raufoss Mk 211 cartridge and other rounds. It has a fully adjustable bipod and buttstock heel rest. Four sling loops allow shoulder and hand carrying of the rifle.  Weighing 15 kilograms (33 pounds), the AW50F rifle is approximately four times the weight of a typical assault rifle. The Raufoss Mk 211 (NM140 MP) .50 calibre ammunition is also heavy. The weight of the weapon, combined with a muzzle brake on the front end and a hydraulic buffer system in the butt, gives the AW50F a relatively low recoil and enhances accuracy.  Most of the rifles are made in the United Kingdom. The barrels are sourced from three different manufacturers: Lothar Walther, Border and Maddco.

Users

 : AW50F.
 : Designated G24.
 : Used by Indonesian Air Force Bravo Detachment 90.
 : Used by ARW marksmen.
 : Used by Royal Malaysian Navy PASKAL.
 : AW50 is used by GNR (Republican National Guard).
 : AW50F Used by 5th Special Operations Regiment.
 : Used by UDT/SEAL.
 : Used by Royal Thai Navy and Royal Thai Navy SEALS.
  Used in limited quantities by EOD units and UKSF.

See also
 Accuracy International AWP
 Accuracy International AWM
 Accuracy International AS50
 Accuracy International AX50

References 

Bolt-action rifles of the United Kingdom
Sniper rifles of the United Kingdom
.50 BMG sniper rifles
Anti-materiel rifles

ja:アキュラシーインターナショナル AW50